The Krupský potok is a tributary of the Dolná Blava in Trnava District,  Western Slovakia. Its source is located near Okrúhla in the Little Carpathians Mountains. It flows into the Dolná Blava in Dolné Lovčice.

References

Rivers of Slovakia